Mesochaete is a genus of mosses belonging to the family Rhizogoniaceae.

The species of this genus are found in Australia.

Species:
 Mesochaete taxiforme Watts & Whitelegge, 1902 
 Mesochaete undulata Lindberg, 1870

References

Rhizogoniales
Moss genera